Glipostenoda luteorubra is a species of beetle in the genus Glipostenoda. It was described in 1965.

References

luteorubra
Beetles described in 1965